The 1956 Commonwealth Prime Ministers' Conference was the eighth Meeting of the Heads of Government of the Commonwealth of Nations. It was held in the United Kingdom in June 1956, and was hosted by that country's Prime Minister, Sir Anthony Eden.

The new prime minister of Ceylon, Solomon West Ridgeway Dias Bandaranaike pressured Eden to remove British military bases in Ceylon; Britain agreed to close the installations.

In international affairs, the leaders expressed their support for the People's Republic of China and Japan being admitted to the United Nations (see China and the United Nations) and welcomed liberalization in the Soviet Union under Nikita Khrushchev hailing the "significant changes" in Soviet domestic and foreign policy as being positive steps for world peace. British attempts to negotiate a diplomatic settlement over Greek and Turkish claims regarding the soon to be independent British colony of Cyprus were also discussed.

Participants

References

1956 in London
1956
Diplomatic conferences in the United Kingdom
20th-century diplomatic conferences
1956 in international relations
1956 in the British Empire
1956 conferences
June 1956 events in the United Kingdom
July 1956 events in the United Kingdom
1950s in the City of Westminster
Anthony Eden
Robert Menzies
Jawaharlal Nehru